The Statue of Niels W. Gade is a statue of Danish composer Niels W. Gade located in Østre Anlæg in Copenhagen, Denmark. It depicts Gade in the process of conducting Elverskud, one of his most famous works. The monument was originally located on Sankt Annæ Plads but moved to its current location in May 1934.

Description
 
The monument consists of a bronze statue of Niels Gade standing on a granite pedestal which incorporates a long bench in its design. The monument measures  455 x 640 x 107 cm. It is situated next to the fence along Stockholmsgade (at No. 45).

 
Gade is shown  standing on a raised podium with a music stand. The conductor's score in front of him is open on a page from Elverskud, one of his most popular works, and the name of the works is inscribed on its rear side. On the pedestal is a relief featuring a lyre with the composer's name in capital relief lettering. A band on the bench is inscribed with some of Gade's most well-known works: " "OSSIAN", "SYMFONI I C Mol", "1817", "ELVERSKUD", "COMALA", "FORAARSFAN-TASIER", "KALANUS", "1890", "KORSFARERNE" and "PSYCHE"

History
 
The composer Niels W. Gade  died in 1890. After a few years a committee of private citizens began to work for the creation of a monument that would commemorate the composer. A site on Sankt Annæ Plads close to the Garrison Church where Gade for many years had worked as organist, was selected. The committee commissioned the sculptor Vilhelm Bissen to design a memorial and the bronze sculpture was cast at Lauritz Rasmussen's bronze foundry. The monument was unveiled on Sankt Annæ Plads on 24 June 1897. The monument was moved to its current location in Østre Anlæg in May 1934.

See also
 List of public art in Copenhagen

References

External links

 The composer Niels W. Gade.

Niels Gade
Outdoor sculptures in Copenhagen
Monuments and memorials in Copenhagen
Monuments to composers
Bronze sculptures in Copenhagen
1897 sculptures
Relocated buildings and structures in Denmark
Statues of men in Copenhagen
Statues of musicians
Cultural depictions of Danish men
Cultural depictions of classical musicians
1897 establishments in Denmark